Diogo Caldas Marques (born 31 December 1992 in Vila Nova de Gaia, Porto District), known as Digas, is a Portuguese professional footballer who plays as a winger.

References

External links

Portuguese League profile 

1992 births
Living people
Sportspeople from Vila Nova de Gaia
Portuguese footballers
Association football wingers
Primeira Liga players
Liga Portugal 2 players
Segunda Divisão players
CD Candal players
F.C. Infesta players
GD Bragança players
S.C. Salgueiros players
Boavista F.C. players
AD Fafe players
C.D. Cinfães players
F.C. Felgueiras 1932 players
Gondomar S.C. players
Amarante F.C. players